In the Pocket may refer to:

 In the Pocket (Commodores album), 1981
 In the Pocket (James Taylor album), 1976
 In the Pocket (Neil Sedaka album), 1979
 In the Pocket (Stanley Turrentine album), 1975
 In the Pocket (Jessica Williams album), a 1994 album by Jessica Williams
 "In the pocket", a slang expression for R&B music with a strong groove